Keira is an electoral district of the Legislative Assembly in the Australian state of New South Wales. It is currently represented by Ryan Park of the Labor Party.

Keira is a northern Illawarra electorate taking in the northern and western Wollongong suburbs of Figtree, Keiraville, Mount Ousley, Mount Pleasant, Balgownie, Corrimal, Bellambi, Woonona, Bulli, Thirroul, Austinmer and Coledale.

Keira was established in 1988 largely as a replacement to the seat of Corrimal. Like its predecessor, it is a safe seat for the Labor Party. Labor have only ever fallen below 60 percent of the two-party preferred vote three times; twice to the Liberal Party in 1988 and 2011 and once to an independent in 1999.

Members for Keira

Election results

References

Keira
Keira
1988 establishments in Australia